The Asia/Oceania Zone was the unique zone within Group 3 of the regional Davis Cup competition in 2017. The zone's competition was held in round robin format in Colombo, Sri Lanka, from 17 July to 22 July 2017. The two winning nations won promotion to Group II, Asia/Oceania Zone, for 2018.

Participating nations

Draw
Date: 17–22 July

Location: Sri Lanka Tennis Association, Colombo, Sri Lanka (clay)

Format: Round-robin basis. Two pools of four and five teams, respectively (Pools A and B). The winner of each pool plays off against the runner-up of the other pool to determine which two nations are promoted to Asia/Oceania Zone Group II in 2018.

Seeding: The seeding was based on the Davis Cup Rankings of 10 April 2017 (shown in parentheses below).

Pool A 

Standings are determined by: 1. number of wins; 2. number of matches; 3. in two-team ties, head-to-head records; 4. in three-team ties, (a) percentage of sets won (head-to-head records if two teams remain tied), then (b) percentage of games won (head-to-head records if two teams remain tied), then (c) Davis Cup rankings.

Pool B 

Standings are determined by: 1. number of wins; 2. number of matches; 3. in two-team ties, head-to-head records; 4. in three-team ties, (a) percentage of sets won (head-to-head records if two teams remain tied), then (b) percentage of games won (head-to-head records if two teams remain tied), then (c) Davis Cup rankings.

Playoffs 

  and  promoted to Group II in 2018.
  and  relegated to Group IV in 2018.

Round robin

Pool A

Sri Lanka vs. Jordan

Syria vs. Pacific Oceania

Sri Lanka vs. Pacific Oceania

Syria vs. Jordan

Sri Lanka vs. Syria

Pacific Oceania vs. Jordan

Pool B

Lebanon vs. Turkmenistan

Qatar vs. United Arab Emirates

Lebanon vs. United Arab Emirates

Malaysia vs. Turkmenistan

Lebanon vs. Malaysia

Qatar vs. Turkmenistan

Lebanon vs. Qatar

Malaysia vs. United Arab Emirates

Malaysia vs. Qatar

United Arab Emirates vs. Turkmenistan

Playoffs

Promotional playoffs

Sri Lanka vs. Qatar

Lebanon vs. Jordan

Relegation playoffs

Pacific Oceania vs. Turkmenistan

Syria vs. United Arab Emirates

References

External links
Official Website

Asia/Oceania Zone Group III
Davis Cup Asia/Oceania Zone